The National Institute of Sports of El Salvador (INDES), is the entity in charge of managing and promoting sport in El Salvador. It is a government institution but it is decentralized and autonomous. It handles around 37 sports disciplines.

History
INDES was founded 28 June 1980 by Decree 300 of the Revolutionary Government. Its first president, Dr. Joel Arturo Rivas Castillo, assumed his post on 4 July 1980 .

Federations
 Archery
 Athletics
 Badminton
 Basketball
 Baseball
 Bodybuilding
 Bowling
 Boxing
 Chess
 Cycling
 Equestrian
 Fencing
 Football
 Gymnastics
 Handball
 Judo
 Karate
 Martial Arts
 Motoring
 Mountaineering
 Motorcycling
 Softball
 Swimming
 Tennis
 Table tennis
 Taekwondo
 Volleyball
 Weightlifting
 Wrestling

External links
http://www.indes.gob.sv

Sport in El Salvador
Sports organizations of El Salvador